Marie Unna hereditary hypotrichosis  is an autosomal dominant condition characterized by scalp hair that is sparse or absent at birth, with variable coarse, wiry hair regrowth in childhood, and potential loss again at puberty.

See also
 List of cutaneous conditions

References

External links 

Conditions of the skin appendages